Giulio Genoino (born c. 1565 in Cava de' Tirreni), the 'mind of Masaniello', was a key figure in the 7 July 1647 popular insurrection against Habsburg authority in the Kingdom of Naples.

Biography
A priest, lawyer, and academic, Genoino had for three decades attempted to influence constitutional change to involve the Third Estate in the government of the city. Despite being a representative of the king to Naples, he was accused of spreading sedition and instigating riots during unrest in 1585 and 1620. After periods of imprisonment and exile, and then in his 80s, he returned to Naples and began advising the fisherman and smuggler Tommaso Aniello—later known as Masaniello—a popular figure among the city's populace. Genoino was the real power behind the popular movement, and supplied the directionless and illiterate Masaniello with advice and a coherent policy. Following the uprising of 7 July, and the assassination of Masaniello on 16 July, the Viceroy attempted to restore order by handing governance of the city to Genoino. He was unable to resist the most extreme demands of the populace.  Following a second revolution in August, Genoino was exiled and the Neapolitan Republic proclaimed.

References
 

 Calabria, Antonio (1990) Good Government in Spanish Naples. p. 254. 
 Kamen, Henry (1971) The Iron Century: Social Change in Europe, 1550-1660. p. 362-3.

External links 
 

People from Cava de' Tirreni
16th-century Italian Roman Catholic priests
16th-century Italian lawyers
Italian revolutionaries
1560s births
Year of death unknown
17th-century Italian Roman Catholic priests
17th-century Italian lawyers